Elophila fengwhanalis is a moth in the family Crambidae. It was described by Pryer in 1877. It is found in Japan (Hokkaido, Honshu, Shikoku, Kyushu, Tokara Islands), China and Korea.

The length of the forewings is 6.6-7.6 mm for males and 6.9-9.1 mm for females. The ground colour of the forewings is pale orange.

The larvae have been recorded feeding on an unidentified rice species. Full-grown larvae reach a length of 15–23 mm. They have a milky white body, suffused with pale brown and a pale brown head.

References

Acentropinae
Moths described in 1877
Moths of Asia